Ian Garry (born 17 November 1997) is an Irish professional mixed martial artist who  competes in the Welterweight division of the Ultimate Fighting Championship (UFC). Prior to his signing with the UFC, Garry was a Cage Warriors Welterweight Champion.

Background 
Garry started training boxing at 10 years old, and when Conor McGregor drew attention to MMA in Ireland, Garry was inspired to try Judo to expand his martial art skillset. He became a black belt in Judo at the age of 18, and after attending university for a couple of months, he dropped out to focus on martial arts. He had his first amateur bout right after he turned 19, and debut professionally at the age of 21.

Mixed martial arts career

Early career 
Hailing from Portmarnock, Dublin in the Republic of Ireland, Garry made his amateur mixed martial arts debut in November 2017 and finished his amateur career in November 2018, racking up a 6–1 record with six finishes and a decision loss over the course of one year.

He made his professional debut in February 2019 at Cage Warriors 101, where he won against James Sheehan via unanimous decision and earned the Fight of the Night award as well as a contract with the promotion. Garry accumulated four more wins in a row, before facing two fight UFC veteran Rostem Akman at Cage Warriors 121. He won the bout in under 8 minutes, setting up a matchup at Cage Warriors 125 against Jack Grant for the Cage Warriors Welterweight Championship. He won the bout and the title via unanimous decision.

Ultimate Fighting Championship 
In July 2021, the reigning Cage Warriors Welterweight Champion announced that he had signed a contract with the UFC, and made his promotional debut on 6 November 2021 against Jordan Williams, scoring a first-round knockout win at UFC 268.

Garry faced Darian Weeks on April 9, 2022, at UFC 273. He won the fight via unanimous decision.

Garry faced Gabriel Green on July 2, 2022, at UFC 276. He won the bout via unanimous decision.

Garry faced Song Kenan on March 4, 2023, at UFC 285. After being knocked down in the first round, he won the bout via technical knockout in the third round.

Personal life 
Garry married Layla Anna-Lee, in Las Vegas on 26 February 2022. In April 2022, it was announced she was pregnant with the couple's first child. He announced he had a son in October 2022.

Championships and accomplishments

Mixed martial arts
Cage Warriors Fighting Championship
CWFC Welterweight Championship (One time)

Mixed martial arts record 

|-
|Win
|align=center|11–0
|Song Kenan
|TKO (punches)
|UFC 285
|
|align=center|3
|align=center|4:22
|Las Vegas, Nevada, United States
|
|-
|Win
|align=center|10–0
|Gabriel Green
|Decision (unanimous)
|UFC 276
| 
|align=center|3
|align=center|5:00
|Las Vegas, Nevada, United States
|
|-
|Win
|align=center|9–0
|Darian Weeks
|Decision (unanimous)
|UFC 273
|
|align=center|3
|align=center|5:00
|Jacksonville, Florida, United States
| 
|-
|Win
|align=center|8–0
|Jordan Williams
|KO (punches)
|UFC 268
|
|align=center|1
|align=center|4:59
|New York City, New York, United States
| 
|-
|Win
|align=center|7–0
|Jack Grant
|Decision (unanimous)
|Cage Warriors 125
|
|align=center|5
|align=center|5:00
|London, England
|
|-
|Win
|align=center|6–0
|Rostem Akman
|KO (head kick)
|Cage Warriors 121
|
|align=center|2
|align=center|2:28
|Liverpool, England
|
|-
|Win
|align=center|5–0
|Lawrence Jordan Tracey
|TKO (punches and elbows)
|Cage Warriors 119
|
|align=center|1
|align=center|4:02
|London, England
|
|-
|Win
|align=center|4–0
|George McManus
|TKO (punches and head kick)
|Cage Warriors 115
|
|align=center|2
|align=center|3:17
|Manchester, England
|
|-
|Win
|align=center|3–0
|Mateusz Figlak
|Technical Submission (rear-naked choke)
|Cage Warriors 110
|
|align=center|1
|align=center|3:41
|Cork, Ireland
|
|-
|Win
|align=center|2–0
|Matteo Ceglia
|TKO (flying knee)
|Cage Warriors: Unplugged 2
|
|align=center|2
|align=center|1:01
|London, England
|
|-
|Win
|align=center|1–0
|James Sheehan
|Decision (unanimous)
|Cage Warriors 101
|
|align=center|3
|align=center|5:00
|Liverpool, England
|
|-

See also 
 List of current UFC fighters
 List of male mixed martial artists
 List of undefeated mixed martial artists

References

External links 
  
 

1997 births
Living people
Irish male mixed martial artists
Welterweight mixed martial artists
Mixed martial artists utilizing boxing
Mixed martial artists utilizing judo
Ultimate Fighting Championship male fighters
Irish male judoka